Inroads: New and Collected Works is a compilation album by Roy Montgomery, released on 13 February 2007 through Rebis Recordings. It couples seventeen previously released compositions with five newly recorded ones.

Track listing

Personnel 
Arnold Van Bussell – remastering
Roy Montgomery – guitar, remastering, photography

References 

2007 compilation albums
Roy Montgomery albums